The Blue Chip Cookie Company is an American gourmet cookie licensor and e-commerce gourmet cookie businesses with headquarters in Milford, Ohio, United States, and store locations in Ohio, Kansas, and Kentucky. Founded in March 1983 by the Nader family (Matt Nader died in 1997), Blue Chip Cookies specializes in gourmet cookies and cookie cakes and created the first white chocolate macadamia cookie.

History 
The first Blue Chip Cookies store opened in March 1983 on Beach Street (Fisherman's Wharf) in San Francisco, California. In 1986, the company began franchising stores in selected markets.

In 1986, Blue Chip Cookies opened a store in Cincinnati, Ohio, a result of the city's efforts to market its nickname, "Blue Chip City". In 1998, Blue Chip Cookies was purchased by Edgewood, Kentucky–based B.C.C. Enterprises, a rare example of a franchisee that had grown larger than the franchisor. A privately held Loveland, Ohio–based company, acquired Blue Chip Cookies in November 2005 and opened a new store in Loveland in June 2006. In January 2007, Blue Chip Cookie Company, Inc resumed franchising and licensing.

In 2007, Blue Chip Cookies focused their attention on driving the online e-commerce business and corporate cookie gifts/marketing by opening an online store.  The  commissary facility for online, corporate gifts and corporate headquarters is based in Milford, Ohio, and have found the strategic decision was instrumental in the overall creation of a new business channel. In addition, Blue Chip Cookies special niche is corporate gifts and marketing initiatives. The company promotes its products as corporate and holiday cookie gifts.

The Blue Chip Cookie Company, Inc is now licensing the brand, to include the proprietary recipes, to select retailers across the United States.  This is a change from their franchising model.

References

Bakery cafés
Restaurants established in 1983
Restaurants in Cincinnati
Companies based in Loveland, Ohio
1983 establishments in California